James Dunne (1921 – 23 February 1972) was an Irish Labour Party politician and trade union official. He was a member of Seanad Éireann from 1969 to 1972. He attended National College of Industrial Relations and University College Dublin where he was awarded a diploma in social and economic studies. He was elected to the 12th Seanad in 1969 by the Labour Panel. He died in office in 1972. No by-election was held to fill his seat.

He became General Secretary of Marine Port and General Workers' Union in 1957, and was President of the Irish Congress of Trade Unions in 1969.

References

 

1921 births
1972 deaths
Alumni of University College Dublin
Trade unionists from Dublin (city)
Labour Party (Ireland) senators
Members of the 12th Seanad
Politicians from Dublin (city)
Presidents of the Irish Congress of Trade Unions
Alumni of the National College of Ireland